Jewish Alcoholics, Chemical Dependents and Significant Others (JACS) was "founded in 1979 by the New York Federation of Jewish Philanthropies."

Part of their work includes "a speakers' bureau and publishing a directory of resources for families in crisis."

History
One of the founders of the JACS Long Island branch explained why Jewish Alcoholics, Chemical Dependents and Significant Others was formed, rather than direct people to Alcoholics Anonymous: "to an observant Jew who has to meet in a church basement ... not always going to work." Another co-founder added that even to "help save one life  ... one of the highest commandments."

One Jewish doctor was anonymously quoted by The New York Times as saying that:
Most 12-step programs have a religious overtone, and it's difficult for people who were raised Jewish to feel initially comfortable with mainstream ideology that is Christian-oriented.

JACS also has a unit called Teen Network, and, like the parent organization, it focuses across various degrees
of religiosity. and several JACS members formed a group "for alcoholics who are children of Holocaust survivors."

A 2001 study by JACS of residents at a Jewish treatment center reported self-identification of 10% Orthodox, 28% Conservative, 32% Reform and 30% non-affiliated.

Blend
The Orthodox Union, which runs some of the Birthright Israel trips, was approached by a JACS program director with 15 years of experience to allow her to "run a trip for young Jewish addicts in recovery" and, later on she became "North American director of the OU's ... Israel Birthright" trips.

References

External links
 Yes ... there are ...
 Measuring it

Non-profit organizations based in New York City
Organizations established in 1979
Therapeutic community